Carlisle Lake District Airport  is a regional airport located  east north-east of Carlisle, England. Due to the COVID-19 epidemic, the passenger terminal has been closed as from the 1st of April 2020 "until further notice".

Carlisle has a CAA Public Use Aerodrome Licence that allows flights up to a maximum takeoff weight authorised (MTWA) of 12.5 tonnes. The airport is located on a hillside above the River Irthing. The airport has been the location for some prehistoric excavations.

Since May 2009, the airport has been owned by Esken (formerly known as Stobart Group) on a 150-year lease. Between December 2014 and September 2015, a £12 million freight distribution centre was built on the south-eastern corner of the site, which is now leased to Eddie Stobart Logistics. Stobart Group also intended to build a further warehousing and distribution hub from 2017 on land adjacent to the freight distribution centre. After financial assistance from the Cumbria Local Enterprise Partnership, there were plans for passenger flights from June 2018 "to major tourism and business hubs including London, Dublin and Belfast" but the target date was postponed. On 4 July 2019 the new terminal was officially opened, and the first scheduled passenger flights since 1993 were commenced by Loganair to London Southend, Belfast City and Dublin airports.

History

RAF Crosby-on-Eden
In the early 1930s, the City of Carlisle County Borough Council opened Kingstown Municipal Airport, at the time outside the borough boundaries which later became RAF Kingstown and is now Kingstown and Kingmoor industrial estates and business parks. With the outbreak of war in 1939, RAF Kingstown's runway was too small for bombers, so the Royal Air Force developed a new airstrip at Crosby-on-Eden to the east of Carlisle, on the line of the Stanegate Roman road. The new facility came into operation in February 1941 for training operations, designating the station RAF Crosby-on-Eden.

Originally housing No. 59 Operational Training Unit, the station provided day training for Hawker Hurricane pilots, which was replaced by No. 9 OTU, 17 Group, Coastal Command in August 1942, for training long-range fighter crews on Bristol Beaufort and Bristol Beaufighter conversion squadrons, as well as air firing and night flying. In August 1944 the station came under the command of 109 OTU, a transport command of Douglas Dakotas. The station was renamed 1383 TCU on 1 August 1945. However, the station had no postwar use or need, and was closed in 1947 with the airfield returning to Carlisle City Council to continue as a municipal airport.

Purchase by the local authorities
In 1960 Cumberland County Council purchased the site and renamed it Carlisle Airport. After a short refurbishment programme it was licensed in 1961 for training purposes and civilian flights to destinations including London, the Channel Islands, Belfast and the Isle of Man. In 1968 the airport was transferred to Carlisle City Council. Most of the original RAF structures remain intact today, although a lack of investment and maintenance has restricted much of the perimeter road, as well as shortening and weight restricting the runways.

In 1997, the council agreed to extend the runway to allow Boeing 737s to land into a new air-cargo hub, but the proposal collapsed.

Sale to Haughey Airports
As the airport had lost £3.5 million on operations between 1979 and 1994, Carlisle City Council agreed to sell the airport on a 150-year lease to Haughey Airports in 2000. The company was owned by Northern Irish entrepreneur Edward Haughey, who owned nearby Corby Castle in Cumbria. Haughey invested £4 million in infrastructure improvements but, whilst promising to provide additional facilities and enhancements to the site for the Solway Aviation Museum, he sold the airfield to WA Developments Limited in 2006 before achieving this.

Acquisition by WA Developments
On 7 April 2006, Haughey Airports was acquired by WA Developments, which had acquired Eddie Stobart Ltd. in February 2004. Haughey Airports Ltd was renamed Stobart Air Ltd and a sub-division within WA Developments called Stobart Air was formed. The airport was then re-branded Carlisle Lake District Airport.

Becoming part of the Esken (formerly Stobart Group)

Following WA Developments' decision to merge Eddie Stobart with the property and ports company the Westbury Property Fund on 15 August 2007 and to list it on the London Stock Exchange as the Stobart Group, Carlisle Lake District Airport initially remained within the ownership of WA Developments, through its subsidiary Stobart Air Holdings. On 10 March 2008, the Stobart Group entered into a £50,000 option, expiring in July 2008, to acquire Carlisle Lake District Airport from Stobart Air Holdings for £15 million (£2.5 million in cash and £12.5 million in new Stobart Group shares). This option was extended in July 2008 until January 2009 for a further £50,000.

In January 2009, Stobart Group's subsidiary, Stobart Airports Ltd, exercised its option to acquire Carlisle Lake District Airport from Stobart Air Holdings for £14 million (£1 million less than originally announced). Following an independent shareholder vote, the acquisition was completed on 30 May 2009, and the purchase price was reduced to £9.9 million due to a fall in the value of Stobart Group shares.

Current operations

Its main activity presently provides facilities for flight training and sightseeing flights. The airport is host to these businesses: Carlisle Flight Training and Aero Club, Border Air Training and Northumbria Helicopters.

Solway Aviation Museum occupies a small part of the site.

A lorry driving training company, System Training, is based at Carlisle Airport Business Park, a site opposite Carlisle Lake District Airport, and was featured in Series 2, Episode 7 of the Channel 5 TV programme Eddie Stobart: Trucks & Trailers, first aired on 30 June 2011. Edd Stobart, the 20-year-old son of Stobart Group Chief Operating Officer William Stobart, passed his HGV Class 2 driving licence using that school.

ECM (Vehicle Delivery Service) Ltd has its HQ at the airport.

In August 2020, during the COVID-19 pandemic in the United Kingdom, part of the site was used as a Coronavirus test facility.

Airport redevelopment
Since the airport's purchase by WA Developments in 2006, and its subsequent ownership by the Stobart Group since 2009, there have been major plans to redevelop the site. The first phase, the construction of a £12 million air freight distribution centre to the southeast of the site, was eventually completed on 7 September 2015. The second phase, of a further warehousing and distribution hub adjacent to the first distribution centre, is being marketed as of 2017. It is hoped that the third phase, the construction of a £1.5 million anaerobic digester renewable energy plant on a piece of woodland to the west of the site, will be completed by 2018.

There were also plans to commence passenger flights to Belfast, Dublin and London by April 2016 but by 2017 these remained just plans. However, in March 2019 it was reported that flights to London Southend, Belfast City and Dublin airports with Loganair were scheduled to start on 4 July 2019.

Redevelopment plans 1
Under WA Developments' ownership between 2006 and 2009, some development was planned for Carlisle Lake District Airport which would have seen the introduction of freight and passenger services in the future, along with the resurfacing of the existing runway to accept larger aircraft as part of a £21 million development. Plans were announced to redevelop the airport site to include a new passenger terminal, an air freight service, a new joint headquarters for WA Developments and Eddie Stobart, and a  distribution centre. Ryanair also expressed an interest in using the completed airport as a hub.

On 4 April 2008 controversy emerged surrounding the proposed developments to Carlisle Lake District Airport. In response to 63 apparently overly restrictive planning conditions placed on the development plans of Stobart Air, Andrew Tinkler apparently intended to move the Stobart haulage and warehousing operation out of Carlisle to Widnes, as a contingency 'plan B', asserting the redevelopment under the proposed condition would not be completed in time.

By 8 April talks had proceeded and centred on ten disputed points.
 
On 10 April 2008 it was announced that Andrew Tinkler and Carlisle City Council leader Mike Mitchelson shook hands on a revised list of conditions for the plan.

Redevelopment plans 2
On 2 December 2008 the Stobart Group announced the surprise £21 million purchase of London Southend Airport. The acquisition was completed on 5 December 2008.

Planning permission was granted in December 2008 for the Carlisle Lake District Airport expansion and other developments, including a resurfaced runway and new terminal, a major transport and distribution facility for Eddie Stobart Ltd, along with a joint headquarters building.

On 30 May 2009, Stobart Group purchased Carlisle Lake District Airport from WA Developments for £9.9 million.

In October 2009 Andy Judge (former Leeds-Bradford, Bournemouth and Luton Airports Operations chief) took over as airport manager. On 7 October at the Cumbria Tourist Board's AGM he confirmed that work at the airport would have begun early 2010 and hoped that flights to Paris, Belfast and Dublin would be in operation by 2011.

However, on 19 May 2010 the Court of Appeal overturned the City Council's decision to grant planning permission due to an objection by a local farmer, a Mr Gordon Brown, on the grounds that a full environmental assessment had not been carried out before permission was considered. Eddie Stobart Ltd. expressed disappointment with the ruling and stated that (although they still retained a long-term commitment to Cumbria), in view of contractual obligations, they would now instead have to use facilities elsewhere.

Redevelopment plans 3

Phase 1
On 14 December 2010, Stobart Air submitted proposals to build a  Air Freight Distribution Centre on the site. Under the plans, Eddie Stobart Logistics would relocate all its Carlisle depots to the airport, and there would be passenger flights to and from London Southend Airport, operated by Aer Arann which would base an ATR 42 aircraft at Carlisle, an airline then five-percent-owned by the Stobart Group through 35 convertible preference shares of €1 each acquired on 10 November 2010. Further details on jobs and flights were supplied in support of the application in July 2011.

On 3 August 2012, Stobart Air was given permission by Carlisle City Council to develop the airport under these proposals. These included the raising and reprofiling of the main runway at the airport. The warehousing contracts would deliver the rental income required to help upgrade the airport facilities and allow passenger flights to commence. Aer Arann identified that passenger routes from Carlisle to Dublin and the Stobart-owned London Southend Airport would be sustainable. Andrew Tinkler, Stobart Group chief executive, said: "The decision is extremely positive for the people of Cumbria as it will drive the economy, boost tourism and safeguard over 800 direct and indirect jobs."

Planning approval was subsequently overturned in the High Court in March 2014. On 19 March 2014, Aer Arann changed its name to Stobart Air. Following a change in the law which no longer required Stobart Air to prove that the airport would have to be viable, planning permission was re-granted on 18 August 2014. No application for a judicial review was received and work started on 3 December 2014. This was completed on 7 September 2015, and the depot is now leased to Eddie Stobart Logistics.

This first development covers 19 acres, and this site was sold to the real estate investment fund Gramercy Europe for £16.925 million on 22 February 2016.

Phase 2
On 22 November 2016, Stobart Group announced it was developing 21 acres of land adjacent to its existing Air Freight Distribution Centre in an area to be called Eden Park.

Phase 3
On 1 October 2015, Brampton and Beyond Energy Ltd (BABE) in conjunction with Stobart Energy announced plans to build a £1.5 million anaerobic digester renewable energy plant on a piece of woodland to the west of the site by 2018.

Passenger movements

Former airlines and destinations
Although regular scheduled flights from the airport have operated, few have been commercially viable leading to a series of failed operations:

 In 1946 after World War II, British European Airways commenced flights to Ronaldsway (Isle of Man Airport) and Belfast, but these stopped in 1947.
 In 1961 BKS Air Transport operated a service to Leeds Bradford International Airport.
 In 1967 Autair started a service to London, using London Luton Airport at first, then London Heathrow Airport. They also operated a summer service to Jersey. In 1969 they stopped all their schedules and changed their name to Court Line.
 In 1978 British Nuclear Fuels began flying nuclear material to customers in the UK and Europe, but this was stopped shortly after coming to media attention, only to recommence in 1987.
 In 1982 Air Ecosse started flights to Scotland (Aberdeen, Glasgow, Dundee), and London, followed a year later for two summer seasons only to the Isle of Man. After the collapse of Air Ecosse in 1985, its routes ceased and only the route to London continued, being run for two years by EuroAir.
 In 1985 Viking began flights to Jersey as a charter operation but the following year operated as a schedule by BAF until October 1987.
 In 1987 Air Furness briefly revived Isle of Man flights until July 1988.
 In December 1988, Pan Am operated a Boeing 727 charter flight from London Heathrow Airport bringing grieving relatives to the scene of the Pan Am Flight 103 crash site at the nearby town of Lockerbie.
 In 1993 New Air started a London service to London Stansted Airport, but collapsed two months later. Lakeside Northwest continued the service until the end of the year, but also collapsed.
 In 1994 Northumberland-based Geordie Air Travel never got off the ground.
 In 1995 Lewis Holidays planned to run Saturday flights to Jersey, which never happened.
 In 1996 Cumbria County Council refused to give financial support to Belgian airline VLM Airlines for 4 flights per day to London City Airport.
 In 2020 Loganair have suspended all scheduled flights from 27 March 2020 until further notice. In July 2020, it was confirmed by Carlisle Airport that Loganair had no plans to resume flights to and from Carlisle airport

Accidents and incidents
 On 17 October 1961, a BKS Air Transport Douglas Dakota G-AMVC crashed on a flight from Leeds Bradford International Airport to Carlisle as it approached the airport in low cloud, rain and strong winds. All four crew were killed.

In popular culture
 Over the weekend of 14/15 May 2011 the airport was used by the BBC to hold the music festival Radio 1's Big Weekend, featuring headline acts such as Lady Gaga, My Chemical Romance and the Foo Fighters. An assortment of stages were assembled on site, including a main tent with a capacity of over 12,000 people.
 The airport has been used for smaller concerts, such as bands like The Script in 2011.
 Stobart Fest was hosted at the airport in 2013, 2014 and 2015.

See also
 List of airports in the United Kingdom and the British Crown Dependencies

References

External links

Official website
Stobart Group official website

Airports in England
Transport in Cumbria
Buildings and structures in Cumbria
Airports in North West England
Irthington